The 33rd Cannes Film Festival was held between 9 and 23 May 1980. The Palme d'Or went to the All That Jazz by Bob Fosse and Kagemusha by Akira Kurosawa.

The festival opened with Fantastica, directed by Gilles Carle and closed with Sono fotogenico, directed by Dino Risi. The showing of Andrei Tarkovsky's film Stalker was interrupted by an electricians strike.

Jury 
The following people were appointed as the Jury of the 1980 feature film competition:

Feature films
Kirk Douglas (USA) Jury President
Ken Adam (UK)
Robert Benayoun (France)
Veljko Bulajić (Yugoslavia)
Leslie Caron (France)
Charles Champlin (USA)
André Delvaux (Belgium)
Gian Luigi Rondi (Italy)
Michael Spencer (Canada)
Albina du Boisrouvray (France)

Official selection

In competition - Feature film
The following feature films competed for the Palme d'Or:
All That Jazz by Bob Fosse
Being There by Hal Ashby
The Big Red One by Samuel Fuller
Breaker Morant by Bruce Beresford
Bye Bye Brasil by Carlos Diegues
The Constant Factor by Krzysztof Zanussi
Dedicatoria by Jaime Chávarri
Ek Din Pratidin by Mrinal Sen
Fantastica by Gilles Carle
The Heiresses by Márta Mészáros
Jaguar by Lino Brocka
Kagemusha by Akira Kurosawa
A Leap in the Dark by Marco Bellocchio
The Long Riders by Walter Hill
Loulou by Maurice Pialat
The Missing Link by Picha
Mon oncle d'Amérique by Alain Resnais
Out of the Blue by Dennis Hopper
Put on Ice by Bernhard Sinkel
Sauve qui peut (la vie) by Jean-Luc Godard
Special Treatment by Goran Paskaljević
La terrazza by Ettore Scola
A Week's Vacation by Bertrand Tavernier

Un Certain Regard
The following films were selected for the competition of Un Certain Regard:
Ballad of Tara by Bahram Bayzai
The Candidate by Volker Schlöndorff
Christopher's House by Lars Lennart Forsberg
Csontváry by Zoltán Huszárik
Days of Dreams by Vlatko Gilić
La femme enfant by Raphaële Billetdoux
The Gamekeeper by Ken Loach
Portrait of a '60% Perfect Man': Billy Wilder by Annie Tresgot
The Rabbit Case by Jaromil Jireš
Sitting Ducks by Henry Jaglom
To Love the Damned by Marco Tullio Giordana
 by Krzysztof Zanussi
The Willi Busch Report by Niklaus Schilling

Films out of competition
The following films were selected to be screened out of competition:
Breaking Glass by Brian Gibson
City of Women by Federico Fellini
I'm Photogenic by Dino Risi
Lightning Over Water by Wim Wenders and Nicholas Ray
Prince Nezha's Triumph Against Dragon King by Yan Ding Xian, Wang Shuchen and Jingda Xu
Public Telephone by Jean-Marie Périer
The Risk of Living by Gérald Calderon
Stalker by Andrei Tarkovsky
Stir by Stephen Wallace
SuperTotò by Brando Giordani and Emilio Ravel

Short film competition
The following short films competed for the Short Film Palme d'Or:

Arrêt momentané by Marie-France Siegler
The Beloved by Michel Bouchard
The Performer by Norma Bailey
Grandomaniya by Nikolay Todorov
Krychle by Zdenek Smetana
Magyar kepek by Csaba Szórády
La Petite enfance du cinéma by Joël Farges
Rails by Manolo Otero
Scheherazade by Susan Casey and Nancy Naschke
Seaside Woman by Oscar Grillo
Sky Dance by Faith Hubley
Z górki by Marian Cholerek

Parallel sections

International Critics' Week
The following feature films were screened for the 19th International Critics' Week (19e Semaine de la Critique):
Adrien's Story by Jean-Pierre Denis
Babylon by Franco Rosso
Best Boy by Ira Wohl
Immacolata and Concetta: The Other Jealousy by Salvatore Piscicelli
Provincial Actors by Agnieszka Holland
The Nineteen Year-Old's Map by Mitsuo Yanagimachi
Ticket of No Return by Ulrike Ottinger

Directors' Fortnight
The following films were screened for the 1980 Directors' Fortnight (Quinzaine des Réalizateurs):
Afternoon of War by Karl Francis
Aziza by Abdellatif Ben Ammar
The Blood Of Hussain by Jamil Dehlavi
Carny by Robert Kaylor
Gaijin: Roads to Freedom  by Tizuka Yamasaki
Gal Young Un by Victor Nuñez
The Handyman by Micheline Lanctôt
Hazal by Ali Ozgentürk
Morning Undersea by Lauro Antonio
Manoa by Solveig Hoogesteijn
Mater Amatisima by José A. Salgot
Oggetti Smarriti by Giuseppe Bertolucci
Opname by Erik van Zuylen and Marja Kok
Order by Sohrab Shahid Saless
 by Alexander Kluge
Pełnia by Andrzej Kondratiuk
Prostitute by Tony Garnett
Radio On by Christopher Petit
 by Robert van Ackeren
Sunday Children by Michael Verhoeven
Sunday Daughters by János Rózsa
Union City by Marcus Reichert

Short films
Noticiero Incine by Frank Pineda and Ramiro Lacayo
Ovtcharsko by Christo Kovatchev
Vietnam, voyage dans le temps by Edgar Telles Ribeiro

Awards

Official awards
The following films and people received the 1980 awards:
Palme d'Or:
All That Jazz by Bob Fosse
Kagemusha by Akira Kurosawa
Grand Prix: Mon oncle d'Amérique by Alain Resnais (unanimously)
Best Screenplay: Ettore Scola, Agenore Incrocci and Furio Scarpelli for La terrazza
Best Actress: Anouk Aimée for A Leap in the Dark
Best Actor: Michel Piccoli for A Leap in the Dark
Best Supporting Actress: Milena Dravić for Special Treatment & Carla Gravina for La terrazza
Best Supporting Actor: Jack Thompson for Breaker Morant
Jury Prize: Constans by Krzysztof Zanussi
Golden Camera
Caméra d'Or: Adrien's Story by Jean-Pierre Denis
Short films
Short Film Palme d'Or: Seaside Woman by Oscar Grillo
Jury Prize: Canada Vignettes: The Performer by Norma Bailey & Krychle by Zdenek Smetana

Independent awards
FIPRESCI Prizes
 Mon oncle d'Amérique by Alain Resnais (In competition)
 Provincial Actors (Aktorzy prowincjonalni) by Agnieszka Holland (International Critics' Week)
 Gaijin: Roads to Freedom (Gaijin - Caminhos da Liberdade) by Tizuka Yamasaki (Directors' Fortnight)
Commission Supérieure Technique
 Technical Grand Prize: Le Risque de vivre by Gérald Calderon (which was shown out of competition)
Ecumenical Jury
 Prize of the Ecumenical Jury: Constans by Krzysztof Zanussi

References

Media
INA: Joint Palme d'Or to Akira Kurosawa and Bob Fosse (Dirk Bogarde and Kirk Douglas present the Palme d'Or to Akira Kurosawa for "Kagemusha" and to Bob Fosse for "All That Jazz" - commentary in French)
INA: Chronicle of the 1980 Festival (commentary in French)

External links 
1980 Cannes Film Festival (web.archive)
Official website Retrospective 1980 
Cannes Film Festival:1980  at Internet Movie Database

Cannes Film Festival
Cannes Film Festival
Cannes Film Festival
Cannes